The Norfolk County Council election took place on 7 June 2001, coinciding with local elections for county councils in England and the 2001 general election.

The Conservatives returned to office with a majority of 12 seats, with Labour losing 8 seats and the Lib Dems losing 3, and went on to rule for three consecutive terms until narrowly losing power in 2013.

Other parties and independent candidates stood without winning seats and making little impact.

Summary of results

|-bgcolor=#F6F6F6
| colspan=2 style="text-align: right; margin-right: 1em" | Total
| style="text-align: right;" | 84
| colspan=5 |
| style="text-align: right;" |
| style="text-align: right;" | 
|-

Election of Group Leaders
Alison King (Humbleyard) was re-elected leader of the Conservative Group, Celia Cameron (St. Stephen) remained leader of the Labour Group and Barbara Hacker (Thorpe Hamlet) was elected leader of the Liberal Democratic Group.

Election of Leader of the Council

Alison King (Humbleyard) the leader of the Conservative group was duly elected leader of the council and formed a Conservative administration.

Results by District

Breckland

Broadland

Great Yarmouth

King's Lynn and West Norfolk

North Norfolk

Norwich

South Norfolk

References

2001 English local elections
2001
2000s in Norfolk
June 2001 events in the United Kingdom